Tarari may refer to:

 Tarari (company), chip manufacturer
 Tarari, Bihar, a village and CDB in India
 Tarari (Vidhan Sabha constituency)

See also 
 Tarare (disambiguation)